The Kawasaki GPZ1100ABS motorcycle, also labeled GPZ 1100 Horizont, was introduced in 1995. It was a sport touring motorcycle with more focus on touring than sports. Based on a ZZR-1100 motor without the ram air and detuned for more mid-range performance, it also had smaller carburetors and a more restrictive exhaust. The bike was more focused on being economical with budget brakes and suspension. Instead of the Ninjas ZX-11's alloy frame, the bike had a steel double cradle frame with a removable front member for engine removal. The motorcycle had a more relaxed seating position and leg position than the ZX-11D/ZZR-1100 or the air-cooled GPZ1100 of the early 1980s .The official Kawasaki designation was ZX1100E. It also was offered in 1996 as an ABS model.

See also
Kawasaki GPZ1100 (1981 – 1985)
Kawasaki GPZ1100 B1/B2 (1981 – 1982)
Kawasaki GPZ series

References

GPZ1100-Sport Touring